Harry H. Halsell (Harry Hurrinden Halsell) (October 1, 1860 – February 3, 1957) was an American cattle rancher in North Texas and Oklahoma, and also a prolific writer of books about ranching life. He was the son of Texas rancher James Thompson Halsell and Maria Louise (Trimble) Halsell.

He was born in Clarksville, Texas, and was married twice, first to Julia (last name unknown) about 1885 (no known children were born to this marriage), then to Ruth Eleanor Shanks on March 10, 1908 in Fort Worth, Texas. He and his second wife had two sons and four daughters, including author Grace Halsell. He died in Fort Worth, and he and his second wife are buried in Decatur, Texas.

Books 
Cowboys and Cattleland (1937)
Memories of Old Chisholm Trail (1939)
Romance of the West (1939)
Ranger (1942)
Prairie Flower (1943)
The Old Cimmaron (1944)
Trailing On (1945)
The Philosophy of Life (1946)
My Autobiography (1948)

References
Holden, William Curry, A Ranching Saga: The Lives of William Electious Halsell and Ewing Halsell, 2 vols., San Antonio: Trinity University Press, 1976
Halsell, H. H., Cowboys and Cattleland, Fort Worth: Texas Christian University Press, c1983
Handbook of Texas Online, s.v. "," http://www.tshaonline.org/handbook/online/articles/fhadt (accessed November 21, 2009)

1860 births
1957 deaths
20th-century American male writers
Writers from Texas
American cattlemen
Ranchers from Texas
People from Clarksville, Texas
American male non-fiction writers
20th-century American non-fiction writers